The County of Ferguson is a county (a cadastral division) in Queensland, Australia, located in the Shire of Banana in Central Queensland.  The county is divided into civil  parishes. The county was officially named and bounded by the Governor in Council on 7 March 1901 under the Land Act 1897.

Parishes 
Ferguson is divided into parishes, as listed below:

References

Ferguson